Early presidential elections were held in the Federal Republic of Central America on 2 February 1835 following the unexpected death of president-elect José Cecilio del Valle during a journey from his native Honduras and the Federation's capital in Guatemala to take the oath. Valle had been elected in June 1834 and was due to take office in 1835.

The elections saw former president and Liberal leader Francisco Morazán win virtually unopposed. However, they were to be the last elections in the Federation, as it was dissolved in 1839, before the end of Morazán's term in office.

References

1835
1835 elections in North America
February 1835 events
1835 in Central America